The Firiza is a right tributary of the river Săsar in Maramureș County, Romania. It discharges into the Săsar in Baia Mare. The Strâmtori Dam is built on the river Firiza.

Tributaries

The following rivers are tributaries to the river Firiza:

Left: Șturu, Valea Neagră, Jidovaia
Right: Valea Călămari, Pistruița, Valea Roșie, Valea Vălinile

References

Rivers of Romania
Rivers of Maramureș County